Yen Ming (born 14 November 1949) was the Minister of National Defense of the Republic of China (Taiwan) from 8 August 2013 to 30 January 2015.

Education
Yen graduated from the Republic of China Air Force Academy in Kaohsiung.

Early career
Upon graduation, Yen worked his way through the Republic of China Air Force, serving as a wing commander, president of Air Force Academy, Air Force chief of staff and Air Force deputy commanding general.

ROC Air Force General

General position appointment
In October 2008, Yen was promoted as the General of the Air Force.

ROC Armed Forces Chief of the General Staff

Chief of the General Staff position appointment
On 3 January 2013, the Ministry of the Interior announced that President Ma Ying-jeou had approved the appointment of Yen to the position of Chief of the General Staff of the Republic of China Armed Forces. He would replace Lin Chen-yi who was appointed as the military strategy adviser to the President.

ROC Minister of National Defense

Ministry position appointment
Yen replaces acting Defense Minister Kao Kuang-chi after the sudden resignation of Defense Minister Andrew Yang, just 6 days after taking his office after the previous Defense Minister Kao Hua-chu's resignation due to the death scandal of Corporal Hung Chung-chiu.

The Executive Yuan officially appointed him on 8 August 2013 from his previous post as ROC Chief of the General Staff. Acting Defense Minister Kao Kuang-chi replaces his position as the ROC Chief of the General Staff.

Taiwanese woman abduction in Malaysia
Commenting on the recent abduction incident over a Taiwanese female in Sabah, Malaysia, Yen said that although the ROC Ministry of National Defense (MND) has the capability of special forces to save the woman, but then those armed forces are reserved for the use of armed conflict between nation, and MND should not step into an international incident which is the ROC Ministry of Foreign Affairs (MOFA) should do. Overseas special forces deployment will only be possible if there is a mutual treaty between the ROC and the host country.

Criticism

Disarmaments of the ROC Marine Corps cause Veterans' protests
In mid January 2014, Yen announced that the government plan to cut the number of military to below 200,000 personnel by the end of 2019 to adjust the organization and restructure the armed forces, in which the goal is to make ROC military to be small but elite, small but skillful and small but strong.

References

Living people
1949 births
Taiwanese Ministers of National Defense
Air force generals
Republic of China Air Force personnel
People from Yunlin County